The Fighter is a 2010 American biographical sports drama film directed by David O. Russell, and stars Mark Wahlberg (who also produced), Christian Bale, Amy Adams, and Melissa Leo. The film centers on the lives of professional boxer Micky Ward (Wahlberg) and his older half-brother and former boxer Dicky Eklund (Bale). The film was inspired by the 1995 documentary that features the Eklund-Ward family, titled High on Crack Street: Lost Lives in Lowell.

The Fighter was released in theaters on December 17, 2010, by Paramount Pictures. The film grossed $129 million worldwide and received largely positive reviews, with critics praising the performances; many comments regarding Bale's weight, accent, and mannerisms widely refer his performance as one of the greatest performances of the century. It was nominated for seven Academy Awards, winning the awards for Best Supporting Actor (Bale) and Best Supporting Actress (Leo).

Plot
Micky Ward is an American welterweight boxer from Lowell, Massachusetts. Managed by his mother, Alice Ward, and trained by his older half-brother, Dicky Eklund, Micky became a "stepping stone" for other boxers to defeat on their way up. Dicky, a former boxer whose peak of success was going the distance with Sugar Ray Leonard in 1978, has become addicted to crack cocaine. He is being filmed for an HBO documentary he believes to be about his "comeback".

On the night of an undercard fight in Atlantic City, Micky's scheduled opponent Saoul Mamby is ill, and a substitute is found in Mike Mungin who is 20 pounds heavier than Micky, a huge difference in professional boxing, constituting two or three weight classes. Despite Micky's reservations, his mother and brother agree so that they can all get the purse and tell Micky that the fighter is out of shape and has ring rust.  They arrive at the fight and find that the substitute fighter is actually ready for the fight and in top shape, and soundly defeats Micky. Micky retreats from the world and forms a relationship with Charlene Fleming, a former college athlete who dropped out and became a bartender.

After several weeks, Alice arranges another fight for Micky, but Micky is concerned it will turn out the same. His mother and seven sisters blame Charlene for his lack of motivation. Micky mentions he received an offer to be paid to train in Las Vegas, but Dicky says he will match the offer so he can keep training and working with his family. Dicky then tries to get money by posing his girlfriend as a prostitute and then, once she picks up a client, impersonating a police officer to steal the client's money. This is foiled by the actual police and Dicky is arrested after a chase and a fight with them. Micky tries to stop the police from beating his brother and a police officer brutally breaks his hand before arresting him. At their arraignment, Micky is released, but Dicky is sent to jail. Micky washes his hands of Dicky.

On the night of the HBO documentary's airing, Dicky's family, and Dicky himself in prison, are horrified to see that it is called Crack in America and depicts how crack addiction ruined Dicky's career and life. Dicky begins training and trying to get his life together in prison. Micky is lured back into boxing by his father, who believes Alice and his stepson Dicky are bad influences and did more damage to his career than good. The other members of his training team and a new manager, Sal Lanano, persuade Micky to return to boxing with the explicit understanding that his mother and brother will no longer be involved. They place Micky in minor fights to help him regain his confidence. He is then offered another major fight against an undefeated up-and-coming boxer. During a prison visit, Dicky advises Micky on how best to work his opponent, but Micky feels his brother is being selfish and trying to restart his own failed career. During the actual match, Micky is nearly overwhelmed, but then implements his brother's advice and triumphs; he earns the title shot for which his opponent was being groomed.

Upon his release from prison, Dicky and his mother go to see Micky train. Assuming things are as they were, Dicky prepares to spar with his brother, but Micky informs him that he is no longer allowed per Micky's agreement with his current team. In the ensuing argument, in which Micky chastises both factions of his family, Charlene and his trainer leave in disgust. Micky and Dicky spar until Micky knocks Dicky down. Dicky storms off, presumably to get high again, and Alice chides Micky, only to be sobered when he tells her that she has always favored Dicky. Dicky returns to his crack house, where he says goodbye to his friends and heads to Charlene's apartment. He tells her that Micky needs both of them and they need to work together. After bringing everyone back together, the group goes to London for the title fight against welterweight champion Shea Neary. Micky scores another upset victory and the welterweight title. The film jumps a few years ahead, with Dicky crediting his brother as the creator of his own success.

The real-life brothers banter as the end credits run.

Cast
 Mark Wahlberg as Micky Ward: Wahlberg elected to star in the film due to his friendship with Ward, with whom he shares an inner-city working class Massachusetts upbringing in a family with eight siblings. Wahlberg also was a huge fan of Ward's, calling him a "local sports hero". The actor was also attracted to the film's central theme, an ordinary person in "an against-all-odds story", which he previously explored in Invincible (2006). To mimic Ward's habits and mannerisms, Wahlberg had him "on set, watching me every single day". During pre-production, the Ward brothers temporarily moved into Wahlberg's home. To add to the film's realism, Wahlberg refused a stunt double and took real punches during the fight scenes, which resulted in him nearly getting his nose broken a couple of times. Wahlberg underwent a strict bodybuilding exercise regimen, dedicating over four years of training to obtain a muscular physique to convincingly play Ward. "The last six movies I did I was also secretly preparing for The Fighter at the same time", the actor continued, "so I would leave three hours early for work and go to the gym and spend three hours there. I would bring the trainers with me on every movie that I did." His uncertainty over the film's development was overruled by his persistence to get the film made. "There were certainly times where I would wake up at 4:30 in the morning, you know, my trainer would ring the bell, and, 'Oh God', I'm like, 'I better get this movie made'. You know, 'Kill somebody if I don't get this movie made.'" Wahlberg hired Freddie Roach as his boxing trainer, helping the actor model Ward's specific fighting style. The last two years of Wahlberg's training resulted in the construction of a "dream gym" in his house for daily use, with a personal boxing ring. He received additional boxing preparation from Manny Pacquiao.
 Christian Bale as Dick "Dicky" Eklund: After both Brad Pitt and Matt Damon dropped out due to scheduling conflicts, Eminem was talked to and considered for the role of Eklund, but he ultimately wasn't cast due to recording conflicts with his music. Wahlberg suggested Bale for the role after meeting the actor at a preschool their daughters both attended. Given Eklund's drug addiction, Bale had to lose weight, which he found easy as he had lost 63 pounds in 2003 for The Machinist (2004). Bale researched the part by taking notes on Eklund's mannerisms and recording conversations for the character's distinctive Boston accent. Director David O. Russell believed Bale's task involved far more than mimicry. "Dicky has a whole rhythm to him, a music. Christian had to understand how his mind works." Russell and Eklund were both impressed by Bale's dedication to staying in character throughout filming. Bale went on to win the Academy Award for Best Supporting Actor at the 83rd Academy Awards for his performance.
 Amy Adams as Charlene Fleming, Ward's real-life girlfriend and wife: Russell said of the actress: "There are very few things that a director can have at his disposal better than an actress who's dying to break type and is extremely motivated to break type. Amy was extremely motivated to play a sexy bitch, and that's who the character of Charlene is. ... She said: 'As long as it happens between action and cut, I'll do anything." And I said: 'That's my kind of actress.' I loved that she had that attitude." Adams was nominated for the Academy Award for Best Supporting Actress at the 83rd Academy Awards.
 Melissa Leo as Alice Eklund-Ward, mother of both fighters and their seven siblings, all sisters. Leo won the Academy Award for Best Supporting Actress at the 83rd Academy Awards.
 Jack McGee as George Ward, Micky's father.
 Frank Renzulli as Sal Lanano
 Mickey O'Keefe as himself, a Lowell, Massachusetts police sergeant who was Ward's real-life trainer. O'Keefe, who had never acted, was hesitant at first, but Wahlberg told him he could do it because as a police officer, he has to act and think fast on his feet.
 Jenna Lamia as Sherri "The Baby" Ward
 Bianca Hunter as Cathy "Pork" Eklund
 Erica McDermott as Cindy "Tar" Eklund, one of Mickey and Dickey's sisters
 Sugar Ray Leonard as himself, making a cameo appearance as a guest commentator at the Ward/Mungin match
 Kate O'Brien as Mickey's sister, Phyllis Eklund
 Alison Folland as Laurie Carroll, Micky's ex, who she shares a daughter Kasie

Production

Development
Scout Productions acquired the life rights of boxer Micky Ward and his brother, Dick Eklund, in July 2003. Eric Johnson and Paul Tamasy were also hired to write the screenplay, which was rewritten by Lewis Colick. In an interview with producer Todd Lieberman, he revealed that rapper Eminem fresh off the success of 8 Mile (film) was originally the first choice for the role of Micky Ward. Mark Wahlberg joined the production in early 2005, with the intention of doing Ward's life story "justice. We don't want to do any over-the-top, unrealistic fight scenes." Paramount Pictures, the United States distributor of the film, hired Paul Attanasio to rewrite Collick's draft in February 2007 in an attempt to emphasize the themes of brotherhood and redemption. Hoping to start production in Massachusetts in June 2007, Wahlberg had Martin Scorsese read the screenplay, hoping he would direct. Scorsese turned down the offer, finding the Massachusetts-setting redundant after having finished The Departed (2006). The actor cited Scorsese's Raging Bull (1980) as an influence for The Fighter, but Scorsese was not interested in directing another boxing film. Darren Aronofsky was hired to direct in March 2007, with Scott Silver rewriting the script in September 2007. Paul Attanasio was also brought in as a script doctor to work on the film prior to shooting. 

Production proceeded with filming set to begin October 2008 and Christian Bale replaced Brad Pitt. By then Aronofsky had dropped out to work on MGM's RoboCop (2014), followed by Black Swan (2010). Wahlberg and Bale chose David O. Russell as Aronofsky's replacement. Wahlberg had also starred in Russell's Three Kings (1999) and I Heart Huckabees (2004). Aronofsky was given an executive producer credit for his contributions on The Fighter, and was enthusiastic to have Russell as the director. In April 2009, Relativity Media stepped up to entirely finance the film, selling the international distribution rights to The Weinstein Company (TWC) a month later. The Fighter began principal photography on July 13, 2009, on an $11 million budget in a 33-day shooting schedule, which was half the budget that Paramount was working with. The production utilized Massachusetts' film tax credits to cover parts of the film's cost.

Filming
Principal photography took place on location in Ward's hometown of Lowell, Massachusetts. Its boxing matches were shot at the Tsongas Center at UMass Lowell, and gym scenes at Arthur Ramalho's West End Gym, one of the real-life facilities where Ward had trained. The boxing-match footage was created "in big, choreographed sections that were taken directly from [video of] Micky's actual fights", said Russell. "And we used the actual commentary from [HBO's] Larry Merchant, Roy Jones Jr., and Jim Lampley." Russell used "[t]he actual cameras from that era. [They were] a sort of Beta [video-format] camera that gave a very certain look, and we actually hired the director from HBO and his crew who had done those fights" to replicate them shot-for-shot.

Comparison to actual events
 The film has Ward on a losing streak coming into the 1988 Mike Mungin fight. In reality, Ward was 18–1 and on a four-fight winning streak when he fought Mungin. Ward's four-fight losing streak actually took place in 1990–91.
 In the film, Ward is knocked down in round six of the Neary fight. In reality, Ward was not knocked down in that fight.
 The film has Ward's career record as 30–7, with 20 KOs, as he fights Neary. In reality, his record at that time was 34–9 with 25 KOs.
 The film depicts Ward taking a severe beating in the Mungin fight. In reality, the fight went the full ten rounds and Mungin won by very narrow decision: 96–93, 95–94, 95–94.
 In the film, during Ward's fight with Alfonso Sanchez, which took place on April 4, 1997, Ward's entrance song is "The Warrior's Code" by Dropkick Murphys. However, that song was not released until 2005 on their album of the same name.

Release
To promote the film, Wahlberg appeared on the cover of Sports Illustrated and Men's Fitness, and Bale on Esquire, in November 2010. An advanced charity premiere took place in Lowell, Massachusetts, the setting of The Fighter, on December 9, a day before the film's scheduled national release.

Home media
The Fighter was released in a Blu-ray/DVD/Digital Copy combo pack and standard DVD in the United States on March 15, 2011.

Reception

Critical reception
Review aggregation website Rotten Tomatoes gives The Fighter a rating of 91% based on reviews from 253 critics, with an average rating of 7.80/10. The site's critical consensus reads: "Led by a trio of captivating performances from Mark Wahlberg, Christian Bale, and Amy Adams, The Fighter is a solidly entertaining, albeit predictable, entry in the boxing drama genre." Metacritic gives the film an average score of 79 out of 100, based on 41 critics, indicating "generally favorable reviews".

Sports Illustrated dubbed the film the best sports film of the decade, and "one of the best since Martin Scorsese backlit Robert De Niro's Jake LaMotta in Raging Bull". Richard Corliss of TIME Magazine named Christian Bale's performance one of the Top 10 Movie Performances of 2010, saying "In a little festival of tart, savory performances, notably from Melissa Leo as the boys' mother and Amy Adams as Micky's girlfriend, Bale shines the brightest, because he knows that no character, however depraved his status, is only a monster. He finds beauty in the beast".

Box office
The Fighter had grossed $93.6 million in United States & Canada and in other territories it collected $35.5 million, for a worldwide total of $129.1 million; the film made a profit over its $25 million budget.

Accolades
The film received seven Academy Award nominations, winning two with Best Supporting Actor for Bale and Best Supporting Actress for Leo, marking the first film to win both awards since Hannah and Her Sisters in 1986. The film was nominated for six Golden Globe Awards: Best Picture (Drama), Best Actor (Drama) for Wahlberg, Best Supporting Actress for Leo and Adams, Best Supporting Actor for Bale, and a nomination for Best Director for Russell. The film received three Chicago Film Critics award nominations: Best Supporting Actor for Bale, and Best Supporting Actress nominations for Adams and Leo. Bale won a Satellite Award, the Critics' Choice Award, the Golden Globe for Best Supporting Actor, and the National Board of Review Award for Best Supporting Actor. Leo won the Golden Globe for Best Supporting Actress.

Sequel
Wahlberg has been involved in developing a sequel, The Fighter 2, which would focus on the legendary fight trilogy between Ward and Arturo Gatti. In 2013, Jerry Ferrara signed on to play Gatti. In 2015, producer Todd Lieberman came out with a statement the sequel is far from over.

References

External links

 
 
 
 

2010 films
2010 biographical drama films
2010s sports drama films
Biographical films about sportspeople
Cultural depictions of boxers
Cultural depictions of American men
American biographical drama films
American sports drama films
American boxing films
Films scored by Michael Brook
Films about dysfunctional families
Films about siblings
Films directed by David O. Russell
Films featuring a Best Supporting Actor Academy Award-winning performance
Films featuring a Best Supporting Actor Golden Globe winning performance
Films featuring a Best Supporting Actress Academy Award-winning performance
Films featuring a Best Supporting Actress Golden Globe-winning performance
Films produced by Darren Aronofsky
Films produced by Mark Wahlberg
Films set in the 1990s
Films set in 1993
Films set in 1998
Films set in Atlantic City, New Jersey
Films set in Boston
Films set in London
Films set in Massachusetts
Films shot in Massachusetts
Films with screenplays by Scott Silver
Sports films based on actual events
Mandeville Films films
Relativity Media films
Paramount Pictures films
The Weinstein Company films
2010 drama films
Films about brothers
Films about mother–son relationships
Films produced by David Hoberman
Films produced by Todd Lieberman
2010s English-language films
2010s American films